Michael Baiardi (born September 11, 1972 in New York City) is an American composer, songwriter and music producer who currently resides in Los Angeles, California.

Baiardi's songs and compositions have appeared in hundreds of feature films, television shows and albums. Most notable are songs in feature films such as The Avengers (2012), Magic Mike (2012), The Taking of Pelham 123 (2009), Greenberg (2010), and Mad Money (2008). Also notable music contributions are TV shows such as Modern Family, Dexter, Justified, Law & Order, CSI, and Jersey Shore.

Career
Michael Baiardi is a graduate of Berklee College of Music. In his early career he performed in a variety of rock and pop groups in the Boston and New York areas. He relocated to Los Angeles in 1998 and began working in house at record labels such as Sony Music, Priority Records and Capitol Records. In 2001 he created the music production company Soundfile Productions Inc. He currently works out of his studio in Los Angeles and provides music to over 50 film and television productions per year.

Filmography

References

External links
Michael Baiardi at Soundfile Productions Inc.

Michael Baiardi The New York Times
Michael Baiardi at Allmusic.com
Michael Baiardi at Berklee Awards
Michael Baiardi at Composer Studios

1972 births
Living people
American film score composers
Berklee College of Music alumni
Record producers from New York (state)